Kwethluk Airport  is a state-owned public-use airport located in Kwethluk, a city in the Bethel Census Area of the U.S. state of Alaska.

As per Federal Aviation Administration records, this airport had 2,923 passenger boardings (enplanements) in calendar year 2007, an increase of 26% from the 2,329 enplanements in 2006.

Facilities 
Kwethluk Airport has one gravel surfaced runway (18/36) measuring 3,198 by 75 ft. (975 by 23 m).

The airport was relocated from its former site at coordinates  which had a 1,750 by 35 ft runway (6/24) and a 5,000 x 500 ft seaplane landing area.

References

External links 
 Resources for this airport:
 
 
 

Airports in the Bethel Census Area, Alaska